John Marvin Perkins (born September 11, 1959), known professionally as John Hawkes, is an American actor. He is the recipient of several accolades, including two Independent Spirit Awards, and has been nominated for an Academy Award and a Golden Globe Award.

Hawkes is known for his roles in the films Winter's Bone (2010) and The Sessions (2012), for which he was nominated for an Academy Award for Best Supporting Actor and a Golden Globe Award for Best Actor – Motion Picture Drama, respectively. Some of his other film credits include From Dusk till Dawn (1996), The Perfect Storm (2000), Me and You and Everyone We Know (2005), American Gangster (2007), Martha Marcy May Marlene (2011), Lincoln (2012) and Three Billboards Outside Ebbing, Missouri (2017). He has also appeared in many television series, notably Deadwood (2004–2006) and Eastbound & Down (2009–2013).

Early life
Hawkes was born John Marvin Perkins in Alexandria, Minnesota, the son of Patricia Jeanne (née Olson) and Peter John "Pete" Perkins, a farmer of wheat, corn, hogs and cattle. He was raised in a "pastoral, small city... a midwest Scandinavian community." Hawkes graduated from Jefferson High School and moved to Austin, Texas, where he was a member of the bands Meat Joy, with Gretchen Phillips, and King Straggler, with fellow actors Rodney Eastman and Brentley Gore.

Career
His first film role was in Future-Kill (1985), credited as John Perkins. He changed his stage name to John Hawkes because there was another actor named John Perkins.

Hawkes played the role of Greg Penticoff in season 1 of 24. From 2004 to 2006, Hawkes played merchant Sol Star on the HBO series Deadwood. He portrayed Dustin Powers, brother of protagonist Kenny Powers, on all four seasons of the HBO series Eastbound & Down, and played Lennon on ABC's Lost.

His other film roles include Me and You and Everyone We Know, The Perfect Storm, American Gangster, Wristcutters: A Love Story, Martha Marcy May Marlene, and Lincoln.

In 2011, he was nominated for an Academy Award for Best Supporting Actor for his performance in Winter's Bone, as well as for a number of other awards, including the Screen Actors Guild Award for Outstanding Performance by a Male Actor in a Supporting Role. He won the Independent Spirit Award for Best Supporting Male. Also in 2011, Hawkes was honored with a Rising Star Award by the Texas Film Hall of Fame.  Hawkes was offered the role of The Governor in AMC’s horror-drama series The Walking Dead. He turned it down feeling he wasn’t the right fit for the role. The role eventually went to David Morrissey.

In 2012, the film The Sessions was considered one of the Sundance breakout hits of that year. Hawkes received two prolonged standing ovations at the film's screening. It was praised by critics at the festival as "accessible, enjoyable, and light-hearted".

In 2016, it was announced that Hawkes would star in the Amazon pilot The Legend of Master Legend, which is based on the popular real-life superhero Master Legend.

Along with cast members, Hawkes expressed interest in reprising his role as Sol Star in a proposed Deadwood film.  Deadwood: The Movie began production in October 2018, and premiered on May 31, 2019. Hawkes, along with virtually the entire series cast, took part in it.

John Hawkes had a small role as a robber in the music video for the cover version of the song "Crying in the Rain" by A-ha in 1990

Filmography

Film

Television

References

External links

 
 John Hawkes Producer Profile for The 1 Second Film

1959 births
20th-century American male actors
21st-century American male actors
American male film actors
American male television actors
American people of British descent
American people of Scandinavian descent
Independent Spirit Award for Best Male Lead winners
Independent Spirit Award for Best Supporting Male winners
Living people
Male actors from Austin, Texas
Male actors from Minnesota
Outstanding Performance by a Cast in a Motion Picture Screen Actors Guild Award winners
People from Alexandria, Minnesota
St. Cloud State University alumni